The Battle of Clark's House was a Western Virginia military operation in Mercer County on May 1 that was a part of Jackson's 1862 Campaign that was outside of the Shenandoah Valley.

References

Clark's House
Mercer County, West Virginia
Clark's House
May 1862 events